Guzmania wittmackii is a species of flowering plant in the Bromeliaceae family. It is native to Ecuador and Colombia, and widely cultivated elsewhere as an ornamental.

Cultivars

 Guzmania 'Attila'
 Guzmania 'Cherry'
 Guzmania 'Cherry Smash'
 Guzmania 'Claret'
 Guzmania 'Daniel'
 Guzmania 'Decora'
 Guzmania 'Dolores'
 Guzmania 'Fiesta'
 Guzmania 'Grapeade'
 Guzmania 'Lila'
 Guzmania 'Magenta'
 Guzmania 'Mariposa'
 Guzmania 'Orangeade'
 Guzmania 'Ostara'
 Guzmania 'Pink Nova'
 Guzmania 'Rana'
 Guzmania 'Rood (Red)'
 Guzmania 'Sunset'
 Guzmania 'Tutti-Frutti'
 xGuzvriesea 'Aphrodite's Lips'
 xGuzvriesea 'Chilli Pepper'
 xGuzvriesea 'Garden Party'
 xGuzvriesea 'Happa'
 xGuzvriesea 'John Buchanan'

References

wittmackii
Flora of Ecuador
Flora of Colombia
Plants described in 1889
Taxa named by Carl Christian Mez
Taxa named by Édouard André